Heart of a Champion may refer to:

 Heart of a Champion (album), an album by Paul Wall
 "Heart of a Champion" (song), a song by Nelly
 Heart of a Champion: The Ray Mancini Story, a 1985 film
 Heart of a Champion (Hollywood Undead song), a song by Hollywood Undead
 Champion (Three Days Grace song), a song by Three Days Grace